Palparidius is a genus of antlions, and the sole member of the tribe Palparidiini.

Species 
Species include:
 Palparidius capicola Péringuey, 1910
 Palparidius concinnus Péringuey, 1910
 Palparidius fascipennis (Banks, 1911)

References 

Myrmeleontidae
Myrmeleontidae genera